The zaire (French: zaïre, code ) was the unit of currency of the Democratic Republic of the Congo and then of the Republic of Zaire from 1967 until 1997. All but six of the 79 series of banknotes issued bear the image of Mobutu Sese Seko. two distinct currencies have existed: The zaire (1967–1993), and the nouveau zaïre (1993–1998).

History

Zaire (1967–1993)

The Zaire, symbol: "Z", or sometimes "Ƶ", was introduced in 1967, replacing the Congolese franc at an exchange rate of 1 zaire = 1000 francs. The zaire was subdivided into 100 makuta (singular: likuta, symbol: "K"), each of 100 sengi (symbol: "s"). However, the sengi was worth very little and the only sengi denominated coin was the 10 sengi coin issued in 1967. Unusually for any currency, it was common practice to write cash amounts with three zeros after the decimal place, even after inflation had greatly devalued the currency. Inflation eventually caused denominations of banknotes up to 5,000,000 zaires to be issued, after which the new zaire was introduced.

History
The zaire was introduced on 23 June 1967, at a rate of one zaire = 1000 Congolese francs = 100 Belgian francs. This gives an implicit exchange rate of US$2 per zaire.

Between 1971 and 1976, the zaire was pegged to the U.S. dollar with an exchange rate of Z0.50 to US$1.
12 March 1976 to 31 October 1978: Zaire pegged at parity with the special drawing rights.
1 November 1978: Zaire devalued to 0.95 SDRs (–5%).
6 November 1978: Devalued to 0.81 SDRs (–14.7%).
27 November 1978: Devalued to 0.7614 SDRs (–6%).
1 January 1979: Devalued to 0.5 SDRs (–34.3%).
24 August 1979: Devalued to 0.375 SDRs (–25%). There was a currency confiscation on 26 December 1979.
22 February 1980: Devalued to 0.2625 SDRs (–30%).
19 June 1981: Devalued to 0.1575 SDRs (–40%).
On 9 September 1983, the zaire was devalued to approximately 28 zaires per SDR (Z1 = 0.035425 SDRs). Afterwards, the currency was floated. The currency continued to lose value, with the exchange rates for one U.S. dollar shown below at certain time periods:
1985: 50 zaires
1986: 60 zaires
1987: 112 zaires
1988: 187 zaires
1989: 381 zaires
1990: 719 zaires
1991: 15,300 zaires
Early 1992: 114,291 zaires
December 1992: 1,990,000 zaires
March 1993: 2,529,000 zaires
October 1993: 8,000,000 zaires (3 new zaires)
December 1993: 110,000,000 zaires (37 new zaires)

Coins
In 1967, coins were introduced by the National Bank of Congo in denominations of 10 sengi, 1 likuta and 5 makuta, with the lower two denominations in aluminium and the highest in cupro-nickel. In 1973, the first coins issued by the Bank of Zaire were issued, cupro-nickel 5, 10 and 20 makuta. In 1987, a new coinage was introduced, consisting of brass 1, 5 and with a 10 zaires in 1988.

Banknotes
In 1967, the National Bank of Congo introduced notes for 10, 20 and 50 makuta, 1 and 5 zaires (also shown as 100 and 500 makuta). In 1971, 10 zaire notes were introduced. In 1972, the Bank of Zaire started issuing notes for 1, 5 and 10 zaires, followed by 50 makuta notes in 1973. 50 zaïre notes were introduced in 1980, followed by 100 zaires in 1983, 500 zaires in 1984, 1000 zaires in 1985, 5000 zaires in 1988, 10,000 zaires in 1989, 2000, 20,000 and 50,000 zaires in 1991 and, finally, 100,000, 200,000, 500,000, 1,000,000 and 5,000,000 in 1992.

The 5,000,000 zaire note, which entered circulation in late 1992, was not accepted as legal tender for several weeks in some parts of the country (notably in the north-east), and in other parts of the country it was accepted for only part of its value. One reason for this mistrust was a grammatical error in the French number on the note, which read "cinq millions zaïres" instead of "cinq millions de zaïres".

New Zaire (1993–1998)
The New Zaire, symbol "NZ", ISO 4217 code ZRN, replaced the first zaire in 1993 at an exchange rate of 1 new zaire = 3,000,000 old zaires. It was subdivided into 100 new makuta (symbol: "NK"). This currency was only issued in banknote form and suffered from extremely high inflation to its predecessor until 1997.

Below is a series of reported exchange rates by the U.S. Treasury (new zaires per USD):
March 1994: 115
June 1994: 450
September 1994: 1,650 to 2,450
March 1995: 2,850
June 1995: 4,900
September 1995: 6,153.85
December 1995: 15,550
March 1996: 23,368
June 1996: 33,367
September 1996: 54,306
December 1996: 93,076
March 1997: 142,560
June 1997: 125,000
September 1997: 115,000
December 1997: 116,000
March 1998: 125,000
June 1998: 133,000
September 1998: 150,000 (1.50 CDF)
December 1998: 240,000 (2.40 CDF)

The new zaire was replaced by the Congolese franc again on 1 July 1998, at an exchange rate of 1 franc = 100,000 new zaires shortly after the Republic of Zaire became the Democratic Republic of the Congo once more, on 16 May 1997.

Banknotes
In 1993, notes were issued by the Bank of Zaire in denominations of 1, 5, 10 and 50 new makuta, 1, 5, 10, 20, 50 and 100 new zaires. These were followed, in 1994, by notes for 200 and 500 new zaires. In 1995, 1000, 5000 and 10,000 new zaire notes were introduced, whilst in 1996, notes for 20,000, 50,000, 100,000, 500,000 and 1,000,000 new zaires were added. All of the new zaire notes feature a portrait of Mobutu Sésé Seko in uniform with cap.

References

Literature

External links
Banknotes of Zaire
Zaire – Currency

Currencies of the Democratic Republic of the Congo
Zaire
Modern obsolete currencies
Currencies of Africa
Currencies introduced in 1967
1997 disestablishments